Ceracris fasciata is a species of band-winged grasshopper in the family Acrididae. It is found in Indomalaya.

Subspecies
These subspecies belong to the species Ceracris fasciata:
 Ceracris fasciata fasciata (Brunner von Wattenwyl, 1893)
 Ceracris fasciata szemaoensis Zheng, 1977

References

External links

 

Oedipodinae